Street Fighter: Legacy is a live-action short fan film based on Capcom's popular fighting game series Street Fighter. The film is a Streetlight Films production, co-directed by Joey Ansah (of The Bourne Ultimatum) and Owen Trevor, produced by Jacqueline Quella and stars Jon Foo as Ryu, Christian Howard as Ken, and Ansah himself as Akuma/Gouki. Both Ansah and Howard are also the writers of the film.

Capcom has said to have "given their blessing" to the film, and the film was released on 6 May 2010. There are currently plans for a series and several cast members have already been chosen.

Plot
The film follows Ryu after waking up from a nightmare about Akuma. While walking in the forest, he is followed by a mysterious warrior revealed to be Ken Masters, Ryu's old friend and sparring partner. The two have a match together using their signature moves Hadōken, Shoryuken, Tatsumaki Senpū Kyaku in the daytime and nighttime in the rain. The film ends with the two in mid-air about to kick.

Cast 
Jon Foo as Ryu
Christian Howard as Ken Masters
Joey Ansah as Akuma

References

External links
 
 Joey Ansah's vision of Street Fighter: Legacy
 Street Fighter: Legacy Movie Interview – Video Interview
 Collider Premieres the STREET FIGHTER LEGACY Live-Action Short Film! Plus Two Awesome Behind the Scenes Featurettes

2010 films
2010 martial arts films
2010 action films
British martial arts films
Fan films
Live-action films based on video games
Martial arts fantasy films
Street Fighter films
Works by Joey Ansah
2010 short films
2010s British films